Mikołaj Sieniawski (c. 1489 – 1569) was a notable Polish magnate, military commander and a prominent politician of his times. He built stone Brzeżany Castle round which the modern town of Berezhany has developed. 
He is not to be confused with his descendant Mikołaj Hieronim Sieniawski, who was also a hetman in 1682 and 1683.

Since 1539 Mikołaj Sieniawski served as a Field Hetman of the Crown and took part in most wars Poland was engaged in. Most notably he organized several successful raids to the area of the Ottoman Empire and Crimea. He took part in the battle of Obertyn in 1531, Under hetman Jan Tarnowski, from whom he adopted the clan crest of Leliwa. Between 1542 and 1553 he was also the voivode of Belz, and after that time he rose to be a voivod of the Ruthenian Voivodship, one of the richest and most populous regions of the Republic. In 1563 he was promoted to the rank of Grand Crown Hetman, that is the de facto commander in chief of the Polish army.

Secular senators of the Polish–Lithuanian Commonwealth
Polish soldiers
Field Crown Hetmans
Great Crown Hetmans
1480s births
1569 deaths
Mikolaj
Starost of Halych
Voivodes of the Ruthenian Voivodeship